The seizure of power, or power-seizure movement during the Chinese Cultural Revolution was a series of events led by the "rebel groups", attempting to grab power from the local governments in China and local branches of the Chinese Communist Party (CCP). The seizure of power began in the "January Storm" of Shanghai in 1967, and rapidly spread to other areas of China. The power seizure usually culminated in the establishment of local revolutionary committees, which replaced the original governments as well as communist party branches, and wielded enormous power that often caused much chaos in the Chinese society.

Brief history 
Mao Zedong launched the Cultural Revolution in May 1966. In January 1967, the January Storm in Shanghai marked the beginning of power-seizure movement, which then spread to other areas of China. Shanghai's was the first provincial level government overthrown. Within days, Mao expressed his approval.  In the next three weeks, 24 more province-level governments were overthrown. Rebel groups across China, such as those in Shanxi, Heilongjiang, Guizhou and Shandong, started their own seizure of power as early as late January. The Cultural Revolution thereafter entered a new phase.

Narrative accounts of power seizures frequently describe student rebels forming an alliance with Party and government functionaries within the government at issue. Sociologist Andrew G. Walder writes that most power seizures resulted not from popular rebellions, but were instead "organized or unilaterally carried out by government functionaries who worked in party and government agencies."  

The end product of the power seizure were the revolutionary committees, which were established to wield the power grabbed from local governments and communist party committees. The revolutionary committees possessed enormous power. Between January and March 1967, there was relatively little disagreement between the Party elite regarding the revolutionary committees approved following provincial power seizures. Mao and his radical allies viewed the revolutionary committees as victories, while pragmatists like Zhou Enlai welcomed the establishment of such committees as a restoration of order and end to economic disruptions.  

Power seizures rarely created stable forms of political authority. Conflicts and power struggle within the revolutionary committees and the rebel groups often occurred, which resulted in nationwide violent struggles and the persecution of a large number of people. 

After the Cultural Revolution, the revolutionary committees were gradually abandoned during the Boluan Fanzheng and "Reforms and Opening-up" period.

Academic analysis 
Walder argues that while party cadres are generally portrayed as targets of a popular insurgency during the power seizures of the Cultural Revolution, cadres were themselves a major force in the national wave of power seizures. Walder writes, "The rebellion was a form of bureaucratic politics in a setting characterized by rapidly shifting signals and high uncertainty, in which rebels' motives were generated after the onset of the Cultural Revolution." In his view, "the collapse of civilian political authority in this vast political hierarchy was more an 'inside out' than a 'bottom up' process."

See also 

January Storm
Revolutionary committee
Six Articles of Public Security
Violent Struggle

References 

Cultural Revolution
1967 in China